Cumberland and Westmorland Convalescent Institution railway station was a terminus off the short Blitterlees Branch off the Carlisle and Silloth Bay Railway, within Silloth itself. The larger railway ran from Carlisle, England. The station does not appear on standard railway maps, but it can be discerned with a magnifying glass on at least two published maps and clearest of all on the 1914 25" OS map. 

The station's sole purpose was to serve the convalescent home of the same name. Although this was the home's formal title, it was widely referred to as "Silloth Convalescent Home", as was the station. The station never appeared in public timetables.

"Invalid Trains" to the station were run on an ad hoc basis, though for many years they commonly ran on Thursdays around 15:00, preceded by a shunter or a guard on foot, as the line to the station was a siding without signals or fencing.

The unstaffed station was minimalist, consisting of a single wooden platform next to the single track.

The home and station opened in 1862. One source states that the station is believed to have closed around 1928, whilst another, with local knowledge, refers to it as both mentioned in the 1937 Sectional Appendix and "open during the Second World War". In 2015 the home was still operating.

See also
 List of closed railway stations in Britain

References

Sources

Further reading

External links
 The station on a navigable Edwardian OS map National Library of Scotland]
 The station on the branch, with mileages Railway Codes
 The line with period photographs Holme St Cuthbert History Group
 The line and station Cumbrian Railways Association
 The station Rail Map Online
 The station and institution from the air Britain from the Air (free login needed to zoom)
 The home and station Rail UK

Disused railway stations in Cumbria
Former North British Railway stations
Railway stations in Great Britain opened in 1862
Railway stations in Great Britain closed in 1928
Silloth